Ahe Dôyamôyô Biswô Bihari is a prayer poem in the Odia language, by the Odia writer Ramakrushna Nanda.

The prayer song was reportedly a favourite of Mahatma Gandhi while he was at Sabarmati Ashram. This prayer poem was included in his Odia textbook Sahitya Sopana, and went on to become the most popular prayer song in Odisha because of its simplicity and beauty.

Lyrics
The full lyrics of this prayer in Odia is as follows:

ଆହେ ଦୟାମୟ ବିଶ୍ୱ ବିହାରୀ, ଘେନ ଦୟା ବହି ମୋର ଗୁହାରି! |୧|

ଜଳ ସ୍ଥଳ ବନ ଗିରି ଆକାଶ, ତୁମ ଲୀଳା ସବୁଠାରେ ପ୍ରକାଶ। |୨|

ଆହେ ଦୟାମୟ ବିଶ୍ୱ ବିହାରୀ, ଘେନ ଦୟା ବହି ମୋର ଗୁହାରି!

ତୁମେ ଶୁଭ ବୁଦ୍ଧି ପରା ଶିଖାଅ, ତୁମେ ଭଲ ବାଟ ପରା ଦେଖାଅ |୩|

ମୋର କାମକୁ କରାଅ ସରସ, ମୋର ମୁଖେ ଦିଅ ଚିର ହରଷ |୪|

ଆହେ ଦୟାମୟ ବିଶ୍ୱ ବିହାରୀ, ଘେନ ଦୟା ବହି ମୋର ଗୁହାରି! 

ତୁମ ଚରଣରେ ମୋର ଭକତି, ଦିଅ ବିପଦେ ସାହସ ଶକତି |୫|

କୂଟ କପଟ ସ୍ୱଭାବ ଯାହାର, ତାଙ୍କୁ ଦୂରୁ ମୁଁ କରଇ ଜୁହାର |୬|

ଆହେ ଦୟାମୟ ବିଶ୍ୱ ବିହାରୀ, ଘେନ ଦୟା ବହି ମୋର ଗୁହାରି!

ମୋତେ ନ ମିଶାଅ ତାଙ୍କ ସାଥିରେ, ସଦା ରଖ ସାଧୁଜନ କତିରେ |୭|

ଦୟା ବିନୟ ହେଉ ମୋ ଭୂଷଣ, କାହା ମନେ ମୁଁ ନଦିଏ କଷଣ |୮|

ଆହେ ଦୟାମୟ ବିଶ୍ୱ ବିହାରୀ, ଘେନ ଦୟା ବହି ମୋର ଗୁହାରି!

ଦୁଃଖୀ ଅରକ୍ଷିତ ସେବା କାରଣେ, ବଳ ଦିଅ ମୋର କର ଚରଣେ |୯|

ସତ କହିବାକୁ କିଆଁ ଡରିବି, ସତ କହି ପଛେ ମଲେ ମରିବି |୧୦|

ଆହେ ଦୟାମୟ ବିଶ୍ୱ ବିହାରୀ, ଘେନ ଦୟା ବହି ମୋର ଗୁହାରି!

ମୋତେ ଏତିକି ଶିଖାଅ ସାଇଁ ହେ, ମୋର ଧନଜନ ଲୋଡ଼ା ନାହିଁ ହେ |୧୧|

ତୁମେ ସବୁଠାରୁ ବଡ଼ ଠାକୁର, ସଦା ରହିବି ମୁଁ ତୁମ ପୟର |୧୨|

ଆହେ ଦୟାମୟ ବିଶ୍ୱ ବିହାରୀ, ଘେନ ଦୟା ବହି ମୋର ଗୁହାରି |

References

Odia-language poems